Coleophora capitargentella is a moth of the family Coleophoridae. It is mainly found in China.

References

capitargentella
Moths described in 1998
Moths of Asia